The Adventurer is an American short comedy film made in 1917 written and directed by Charlie Chaplin, and is the last of the twelve films made under contract for the Mutual Film Corporation.

Plot 

This film starts with a man-hunt, where the police are hunting for an escaped convict (Charlie Chaplin) who has cleverly eluded the guards so far. One police officer (Henry Bergman) is told to guard the beach in case the escaped felon came within sight again. However, unbeknownst to the officer, Charlie is actually under a load of sand, buried right next to the officer.

Fully aware of the danger, he is very cautious regarding his escape. He unburies himself very cautiously, however, Bergman is asleep, and he falls back on the hole which Charlie created while un-burying himself. Of course, Charlie makes a run, but it is too late.

The officer fires, luckily missing Charlie by an inch. Charlie hurriedly climbs up a vertical wall of mud and stone, with the officer giving chase. Charlie, however, finishes Bergman off by throwing a rock at him. In vain, he shoots, but it misses Charlie's head by a mile.

A few seconds later, however, it seems Charlie is finished when a policeman stealthily creeps up to him. He steps on his hand, presumably to not let him escape, presumably as a reminder that his time is up. However, Charlie thinks it's a stray stone and covers it with mud. When he looks up and sees the officer, however, the chase resumes. With sheer athletic abilities and presence of mind, the Tramp eludes the officer. Charlie runs, and runs, and runs, and runs, and runs...and runs ker-plam! into a bunch of officers.

Charlie runs all the way up to the top of the dusty cliff. Just when it seems like Charlie is free, another officer leaps in out of nowhere and shoots Charlie. However, the shot missed its mark, and Charlie, feigning death, fools the officer successfully. In the middle of the check-up to make sure the convict was dead, Charlie kicks him down the hill.

He takes the officer's hiding place (a very cleverly-masked hole in the rock) while Bergman and his companion come to that same spot looking for Charlie. Charlie sees them and makes a stealthy escape—however, not stealthy enough to alert them at the last moment.

Charlie comes through to the other end of the hole, grabs a police officer's gun, and uses this to threaten the police. All the while, he tiptoes backwards, and, unbeknownst to him, he's heading toward the deep seas. He, of course, trips against a stray rock and accidentally fires at Bergman. Luckily, the shot wasn't fatal, but it was painful enough to piss him off.

Helpless, Charlie swims towards the deep seas. The policemen give chase with the help of a boat. Of course, they are unprepared for the high tide, and a huge wave knocks them over. Charlie swims over towards a boat where a man is desperately trying to take out his wet shirt.

The scene cuts towards a girl and her lover (Edna Purviance and Eric Campbell). They realize Edna's mother (Marta Golden) is drowning. They go over to help her. Edna begs Campbell to help, but he refuses because of his fatness. She jumps in, while Campbell leans against the fence and hawks at her. However, this man's sheer weight contributes to the fence giving away, and, of course, Campbell goes ker-plam! into the water.

Hearing the chaos ensuing between Campbell, Edna and her mother, Charlie, who had just found some dry land, decides to investigate. He jumps back into the water and swims over to where he thinks the chaos is taking place. He finds Edna on the shore, frantic, and Edna, seeing Charlie, begs him to save her mother. Charlie, instead of saving her mother, who was in dire need of help, swims towards Campbell instead, and swims circles around him.

Finally, he takes his beard, and with the help of that he pulls him back to shore.

He rescues everybody else, and then lets them get warm. The authorities arrive, and Edna's unconscious mother is the first to go into the ambulance. However, she soon gains her consciousness, and Charlie serenades her with lies ("I heard your shout from my yacht!" "I couldn't turn down two people shouting -- you, my lady, did not deserve drowning!") and then heads back to rescue Campbell, in the process carelessly (and unintentionally) tossing him back into the water.

When he discovers his blunder, he goes back and rescues the man. However, in the process of the rescue, Charlie hurts himself and lies down on the shore, helpless and unable to walk. He writhes and groans in pain helplessly. Luckily for him, however, a policeman saw him, called Edna, and rescues the injured Charlie.

Charlie now wakes up in the house of Edna, the woman he loves. However, him wearing his striped prison uniform makes him think he is in prison, which is cleared when the butler enters with a towel. The scene then cuts to Charlie walking down the stairs with the glamorous party attire of the time, "dressed in somebody's best", according to the intertitle cards. The butler comes over with the drinks, and Charlie takes a glass, hands it to the butler, takes a beer bottle and pours the drink, initially on the floor.

Then he tries to hand the butler his cigarette, and seeing a bewildered look on his face, waved at him to get out. Edna sees him, of course, and much to the rage of her lover, goes up to him. When he sees her, instinctively he goes into the "attention" position to greet her, which resulted in the open beer bottle to go upside-down, and the beer sloshing down.

Edna and Charlie go to the balcony to socialize, where Charlie accidentally kicks Bergman. Bergman thinks it is intentional, however, and kicks him back. They go on kicking each other for a while, till a lady intervenes between Charlie and Bergman. Since Bergman and Charlie had their backs to each other, Bergman couldn't see the lady intervening. Therefore, he kicks her butt, thinking it's Charlie's he's kicked. He goes red when he realizes his blunder, but the damage is done—Edna is disgusted at him, the victim weirded out, and Charlie feigns calmness and glares at him.

Inside, while Edna plays the piano, Bergman tries getting revenge but to no avail. Charlie sloshes a whole lot of beer on him, and he retreats. However, when he does, he sees Charlie's face on the newspaper, under the headline "Criminal Escapes: Convict at Large".

Of course, this was a good way of getting revenge. Therefore, when Charlie talks away with Edna's dad, who was Judge Brown, the man who sentenced him to prison, Charlie is scared. But he acts calm, going under the alias "Commodore". However, at the worst possible moment, Bergman barges in, shoves "Commodore" out and tells him all about Charlie and his face in the newspaper, and how he was the escaped convict. When Charlie comes across the headline, he is scared stiff and nervous. As a last resort, he takes out his pen and draws a beard, so (hopefully) Judge Brown thinks he is Henry Bergman.

Of course, Brown falls for the trap. When a determined Bergman stalks in with the judge, he grabs the paper and shows it to Brown. Of course, Brown thinks that this man has got it wrong, and shows it to Charlie. Charlie looks at the paper, and looks back at Bergman. "You need a shave!" he remarks, and goes back in to socialize—not before kicking Bergman in the crotch, though!

He talks to everybody inside, trying to blend in after that near brush with Judge Brown. He talks to everybody, including Edna, and then decides to go to the kitchen with Edna.

But in the kitchen, a policeman and his wife are making love to each other, so when the knock sounds, the policeman hurriedly goes towards the closet. Charlie and Edna enter just as she is closing the door, so Charlie is secretly curious. He opens the closet, sees the policeman and, in an instant, closes the door and darts out of the room.

What follows is a nerve-wracking chase with some slapstick overtures. Several times, Charlie comes close to getting caught. Several times, he survives by the skin of his teeth. And, in the end, one police officer corners him. It looks like the end, like Charlie will finally be apprehended—until Charlie outwits him. He introduces the policeman and Edna, and when the policeman is taking his police hat off, Charlie breaks away from his grasp and runs away, the police hot on his trail.

Cast
 Charles Chaplin - The Convict
 Edna Purviance - The Girl
 Eric Campbell - The Suitor
 Henry Bergman - The Father
 Albert Austin - The Butler
 Marta Golden - The Girl's Mother
 May White - Lady
 Frank J. Coleman - Prison Guard (uncredited)

Critical reception

A re-release of the film inspired this enthusiastic review in the August 16, 1920 New York Times. This was written during a period in which Chaplin's film output was practically nonexistent.
"On the Rivoli program, and also at the Rialto, is a Chaplin revival. The Adventurer, which makes one wish, between laughs, that the screen's best comedian would get to work and do what everyone knows he is capable of. There is a slap-stick coarse humor in The Adventurer, but also some of Chaplin's most irresistible pantomime."

Sound version
In 1932, Amedee Van Beuren of Van Beuren Studios, purchased Chaplin's Mutual comedies for $10,000 each, added music by Gene Rodemich and Winston Sharples and sound effects, and re-released them through RKO Radio Pictures. Chaplin had no legal recourse to stop the RKO release.

See also
 List of American films of 1917
 Charlie Chaplin filmography

References

External links

1917 films
Short films directed by Charlie Chaplin
American silent short films
American black-and-white films
1917 comedy films
Silent American comedy films
Articles containing video clips
American comedy short films
Mutual Film films
1917 short films
1910s American films